Emil Stoev (born 15 March 1986) is a Bulgarian football player, currently playing for Dimitrovgrad as a forward.

References

 

1986 births
Living people
Bulgarian footballers
First Professional Football League (Bulgaria) players
Association football forwards
FC Spartak Plovdiv players
Botev Plovdiv players
PFC Lokomotiv Plovdiv players
PFC Vidima-Rakovski Sevlievo players